Qəzli (also, Gazli and Kozly) is a village in the Ismailli Rayon of Azerbaijan.  The village forms part of the municipality of Mican.

References 

Populated places in Ismayilli District
Populated places in Azerbaijan